Eschata is a genus of moths of the family Crambidae.

Description
Palpi porrect (extending forward), reaching slightly beyond the frons and thickly scaled. Maxillary palp dilated with scales and nearly as long as labial. Frons produced to an acute corneous point. Antennae of male thickened and flattened. Tibia and tarsal joints fringed with long hairs. Forewings with vein 3 from before the angle of cell. Vein 7 from cell, anastomosing (fusing) or stalked with veins 8 and 9. Vein 10 free, whereas vein 11 curved and running along the vein 12. Hindwings with veins 3, 4 and 5 from angle of cell and veins 6 and 7 from upper angle.

Species
Eschata aida Błeszyński, 1970
Eschata argentata Moore, 1888
Eschata chrysargyria (Walker, 1865)
Eschata conspurcata Moore, 1888
Eschata gelida Walker, 1856
Eschata hainanensis Wang & Sung, 1981
Eschata himalaica Błeszyński, 1965
Eschata horrida Wang & Sung, 1981
Eschata irrorata Hampson, 1919
Eschata isabella Błeszyński, 1965
Eschata melanocera Hampson, 1896
Eschata minuta Wang & Sung, 1981
Eschata miranda Błeszyński, 1965
Eschata ochreipes Hampson, 1891
Eschata percandida Swinhoe, 1890
Eschata quadrispinea W. Li & Liu, 2012
Eschata radiata Swinhoe, 1906
Eschata rembrandti Błeszyński, 1970
Eschata rififi Błeszyński, 1965
Eschata rococo Błeszyński, 1970
Eschata shafferella Błeszyński, 1965
Eschata shanghaiensis Wang & Sung, 1981
Eschata smithi Błeszyński, 1970
Eschata tricornia Song & Chen in Chen, Song & Yuan, 2003
Eschata truncata Song & Chen in Chen, Song & Yuan, 2003
Eschata xanthocera Hampson, 1896
Eschata xanthorhyncha Hampson, 1896

References

Chiloini
Crambidae genera
Taxa named by Francis Walker (entomologist)